John Alan Smith (born 25 September 1942) is a Zambian former wrestler. He competed in the men's freestyle featherweight at the 1964 Summer Olympics.

References

External links
 

1942 births
Living people
Northern Rhodesia people
Zambian male sport wrestlers
Olympic wrestlers of Northern Rhodesia
Wrestlers at the 1964 Summer Olympics
Place of birth missing (living people)